Q

Bishnupaduka  is a village development committee in Sunsari District in the Kosi Zone of south-eastern Nepal. At the time of the 1991 Nepal census it had a population of 3651 people living in 661 individual households. It was merged into Dharan in December 2014.

References

Populated places in Sunsari District